UPPAAL is an integrated tool environment for modeling, validation and verification of real-time systems modeled as networks of timed automata, extended with data types (bounded integers, arrays etc.).

It has been used in at least 17 case studies since its release in 1995, including on Lego Mindstorms, for the Philips audio protocol, and in gearbox controllers for Mecel.

The tool has been developed in collaboration between the Design and Analysis of Real-Time Systems group at Uppsala University, Sweden and Basic Research in Computer Science at Aalborg University, Denmark.

There are the following extensions available:
Cora for Cost Optimal Reachability Analysis.
Tron for Testing Real-time systems ON-line (black-box conformance testing).
Cover for COVERerage-optimal off-line test generation.
Tiga for TImed GAmes based controller synthesis.
Port for component based timed systems, exploiting Partial Order Reduction Techniques.
Pro for PRObabilistic reachability analysis. (Discontinued)
SMC for Statistical Model Checking.

References

External links
UPPAAL academic website
UPPAAL commercial website
Design and Analysis of Real-Time Systems group 
DEIS unit, Dept. Computer Science at AAU

Model checkers